Kitty Ann Mountain in New Jersey, United States is located in the Ramapos of the Appalachian Mountains, rising above Kinnelon in Morris County. The mountain has an 80-foot tower atop it. The summit lies at 1159 feet above sea level. The prominence of the north slope is 892 feet, the highest in New Jersey; the east, west, and south slopes are 814 feet, 758 feet, and 259 feet.

Rocks and development 
The mountain, which grows 2.4 millimeters a year as a result of the Ramapo mountain fault, is composed of granite, marble, limestone, quartz, and gneiss.

Trees and wildlife 
Local arboreal flora include birch, maple, oak, pine, and sassafras; wildlife includes white-tailed deer, rabbits, squirrels, coyote, fox, raccoon, beaver, groundhog, American black bear, and eastern wolf.

References

Mountains of New Jersey
Ramapos
Mountains of Morris County, New Jersey